SKS Airways is a regional airline operating in Malaysia, primarily serving routes to/from outlying islands.

History 
SKS Airways was founded in November 2017, receiving its AOC in October 2021, and launched its first commercial flight from Subang to Pangkor, on 25 January 2022. The airline received its first DHC 6-300 Twin Otter on 15 July 2019 and receiving their second DHC 6-300 Twin Otter on 23 December 2020.

Destinations 
As of February 2022, SKS Airways served the following scheduled passenger destinations:

Fleet 
As of February 2022, the SKS Airways fleet consists of the following aircraft:

References

External links
 Official website

2017 establishments in Malaysia
Airlines of Malaysia
Privately held companies of Malaysia
Airlines established in 2017